Amazing Rain is an illustrated novel by artist Sam Brown.  Published in November, 2004, it contains all new artwork, which nonetheless appears to be based on the artwork of his website, explodingdog.com.

Plot summary
The book begins with the main character describing the city they (the character's gender is unclear) live in, "the city you can not see out of".  Many of the city's residents believe it is impossible to leave the city, but the main character suggests that he and the reader should leave, "because there is something I want to talk to you about".

Leaving the city, the main character and the reader drive until their car breaks down, at which point they continue on foot until they come across a house where a strange person (who looks like what is presumably an alien on the explodingdog site) invites them in, offers them soup, and tells stories.  The first story is the story of the king, a narrative about a king who believes he has improved the land he rules, making his people happy (by forcing them to wear happy masks, a point that is not mentioned in the narrative but clear from the artwork).  The king has also built "an amazing army" and "wonderful weapons".

Next, the alien host tells about the future.  For example, in the future we will get our food over the internet.  The title of the book comes from the statement that, "in the future, the rain will never mess up your hair".

In the end, with the king's rockets raining down on them, the main character and the reader flee.  The main character has decided that "I love you" and "I want us to be together".  Torn to shreds by the rockets, they flee into the ocean, where they are eaten by fish.

Connections to explodingdog

Amazing Rain reveals some things about the characters that appear in the explodingdog.com drawings.  The beings that appear to be constructed from cardboard boxes are revealed to, in fact, be made out of cardboard.  The story of the king reveals a possible reason that several explodingdog characters are seen wearing masks.

References 

2004 novels